The 1983 Australian Formula 2 Championship was a CAMS sanctioned national motor racing title for drivers of racing cars complying with Australian Formula 2 regulations.

South Australian driver Ian Richards won the championship in his self designed Richards 201 Volkswagen. Richards won by a single point from Peter Glover who drove two Cheetah Racing Cars (Mk 7 and Mk 7D) powered by a Toyota and Isuzu engine respectively. Finishing equal third on 11 points each were David Crabtree driving a Cheetah Mk 6 BMW, and Greg Ferrall driving an Elfin GE Two-25 Wolkswagen.

Calendar
The title was contested over a four-round series.
 Round 1, Oran Park, New South Wales, 20 March
 Round 2, Winton, Victoria, 27 March
 Round 3, Sandown, Victoria, 17 April
 Round 4, General Credits Cup, Adelaide International Raceway, South Australia, 1 May

Results 

Championship points were awarded on a 9-6-4-3-2-1 basis to the top six placegetters in each round.

References 

 CAMS Manual of Motor Sport, 1983
 Official Programme, Adelaide International Raceway, 1 May 1983
 CAMS Manual

Australian Formula 2 Championship
Formula 2 Championship